The Pacific Philosophical Quarterly is a quarterly peer-reviewed academic journal of philosophy published by Wiley-Blackwell on behalf of the School of Philosophy (University of Southern California) and is edited by the faculty there. The journal covers all major areas of philosophy in the analytic tradition, sometimes as special issues aimed at a particular topic.

History
The journal was established in 1920 as The Personalist by Ralph Tyler Flewelling and focused on the philosophy of personalism. It obtained its current name in 1980 and "devoted itself exclusively to analytical and logical philosophy".

References

External links
 

Philosophy journals
Wiley-Blackwell academic journals
Quarterly journals
Publications established in 1920
English-language journals
Academic journals associated with universities and colleges of the United States